Convergent cross mapping (CCM) is a statistical test for a cause-and-effect relationship between two variables that, like the Granger causality test, seeks to resolve the problem that correlation does not imply causation. While Granger causality is best suited for purely stochastic systems where the influences of the causal variables are separable (independent of each other), CCM is based on the theory of dynamical systems and can be applied to systems where causal variables have synergistic effects. As such, CCM is specifically aimed to identify linkage between variables that can appear uncorrelated with each other.

Theory
In the event one has access to system variables as time series observations, Takens' embedding theorem can be applied. Takens' theorem generically proves that the state space of a dynamical system can be reconstructed from a single observed time series of the system, .

Convergent Cross Mapping (CCM) leverages a corollary to the Generalized Takens Theorem that it should be possible to cross predict or cross map between variables observed from the same system.

If the prediction skill of  increases and saturates as the entire  is used, this provides evidence that  is causally influencing .

Cross mapping is generally asymmetric.

Algorithm
The basic steps of convergent cross mapping for a variable  of length  against variable  are:

 If needed, create the state space manifold  from 
 Define a number of ensembles  to evaluate at each library size. 
 At each library subset size :
 For  ensembles: 
 Randomly select  state space vectors from 
 Estimate  from the random subset of  using the Simplex state space prediction 
 Compute the mean correlation  over the  ensembles at 
 The spectrum of  versus  must exhibit convergence. 
 Assess significance.

Applications
Demonstrating that the apparent correlation between sardine and anchovy in the California Current is due to shared climate forcing and not direct interaction.

Inferring the causal direction between groups of neurons in the brain.

Untangling Brain-Wide Dynamics in Consciousness.

Analyzing potential environmental drivers of malaria cases in Northwestern Argentina.

Environmental context dependency in species interactions.

Extensions
Extensions to CCM include:
 Extended Convergent Cross Mapping
 Convergent Cross Sorting

See also 
 Empirical dynamic modeling
 System dynamics
 Complex dynamics

References

Further reading

External links
Animations:
 
 
 

Nonlinear systems
Predictive analytics
Nonlinear time series analysis
Time series statistical tests